The Sublett Range is a mountain range in the U.S. states of Idaho (~94%) and Utah (~6%), spanning Cassia, Oneida, and Power counties, Idaho and reaching into Box Elder County, Utah. The Phosphoria Formation reaches its greatest thickness beneath the mountains.

The northern part of the mountains are part of the Sublett Division of the Minidoka Ranger District of Sawtooth National Forest. The range was named after the trapper William Sublette, who lived in the area in the 1830s.

The Raft River and Black Pine mountains are southwest of the range, while the Albion Mountains are to the west. The northern part of the mountains are in the Snake River watershed, which is a tributary of the Columbia River, while the southern section drains to the Great Salt Lake. The town of Snowville, Utah is south of the mountains, Malta, Idaho is to the west, and American Falls, Idaho is to the north. Interstate 84 passes just to the south and west of the mountains. Most of the mountains are covered in sagebrush steppe and meadows, but there can be pockets of Douglas fir on northern slopes.

References

External links 
 U.S. Forest Service Sawtooth National Forest

Mountain ranges of Box Elder County, Utah
Landforms of Cassia County, Idaho
Mountain ranges of Idaho
Sawtooth National Forest